Wo Hop is a Chinese restaurant in Manhattan’s  that was named an American Classic in 2022 by the James Beard Foundation Award.  It is the second oldest restaurant in Manhattan’s Chinatown.

Effects of COVID

In March 2021, Manager David Huang said he believed they lost about 70% of their business compared to pre-pandemic levels.

References

External links
2010 New York Times Review
Chris Cheung Reveals More About the ‘Phantom Menus’ of Chinatown

Chinese restaurants in New York (state)
Restaurants in Manhattan
James Beard Foundation Award winners
Restaurants established in 1938
1938 establishments in New York City
Chinatown, Manhattan